Qaiku was a micro-blogging and lifestreaming service comparable to Twitter and Jaiku. It allowed users to post short text or picture messages that other users can then comment. In comparison to Twitter and Jaiku, Qaiku had a multilingual focus, with all messages marked and searchable based on their language. It was shut down on October 15, 2012.

History

Qaiku was developed in winter 2009 by Rohea to provide an evolving replacement for the Jaiku service that had been seen as stagnating since it was bought by Google on October 9, 2007.

The website launched on March 9 to an initially Finnish audience. Later Finnish Midgard company Nemein joined the project.

On July 29, 2009 translation of the website to new languages was opened to external contributors to enhance the multilingual appeal of the site.

In September 2009 Qaiku team announced that there will be a version of Qaiku targeted at organizational microblogging provided as software as a service.

On October 7, 2009 Qaiku expanded with Italian and Polish versions.

On September 21, 2012, Qaiku announced that it would be shutting down on October 15, 2012, for a variety of reasons.

Software
Qaiku was a website that has been built on top of the Midgard content management framework. It provides both a view optimized for desktop browsers and mobile browser view.

See also

 Brightkite
 Identi.ca
 Jaiku
 Twitter

References

Defunct microblogging services
Defunct social networking services
2009 establishments in Finland
2012 disestablishments in Finland
Internet properties disestablished in 2012
Internet properties established in 2009